The LEN Super Cup is an annual water polo match organized by LEN and contested by the reigning champions of the two European club competitions, the LEN Champions League and the LEN Euro Cup.

From 1976 to 2002, the LEN Super Cup was contested between the winners of the European Champions Cup/LEN Champions League and the winners of the LEN Cup Winners' Cup. After the discontinuation of the LEN Cup Winners' Cup, it has been contested by the winners of the LEN Champions League and the winners of the LEN Trophy, which was renamed the LEN Euro Cup in 2011.

Title holders 

 1976  Mladost 
 1977  CSK VMF Moscow
 1978  Ferencváros
 1979  OSC Budapest
 1980  Ferencváros
 1981  CSK VMF Moscow
 1982  Barcelona
 1983  CSK VMF Moscow
 1984  POŠK 
 1985  Vasas
 1986  Spandau 04
 1987  Spandau 04
 1988  Pescara
 1989 Not held
 1990  Mladost
 1991  Partizan
 1992  Catalunya
 1993  Pescara
 1994  Újpest
 1995  Catalunya
 1996  Mladost
 1997–2001 Not held
 2002  Olympiacos
 2003  Pro Recco
 2004  Honvéd
 2005  Posillipo
 2006  Jug Dubrovnik
 2007  Pro Recco
 2008  Pro Recco
 2009  Primorac Kotor
 2010  Pro Recco
 2011  Partizan
 2012  Pro Recco
 2013  Crvena zvezda
 2014  Atlètic-Barceloneta
 2015  Pro Recco
 2016  Jug Dubrovnik
 2017  Szolnok
 2018  Ferencváros
 2019  Ferencváros
 2020 Cancelled due to COVID-19 pandemic
 2021  Pro Recco
 2022  Pro Recco

Finals

Titles by club

References

External links
 Official LEN website 

 
Recurring sporting events established in 1976
LEN club water polo competitions
Multi-national professional sports leagues